Thomas Gamey (1825 – 1898) was an Irish-born Ontario farmer and political figure. He represented Grey Centre in the Legislative Assembly of Ontario from 1894 to 1898 as a Patrons of Industry-Protestant Protective Association member.

He was born in County Tyrone, Ireland, the son of Thomas Gamey, and came to Upper Canada with his family in 1834. He served thirty-three years as reeve for Osprey Township (1857–1859, 1861–1869, 1871–1875, 1879–1880, 1884–1885, 1889-1894) and was also warden for Grey County (1866). Gamey was a justice of the peace.

References

External links 
The Canadian parliamentary companion, 1897 JA Gemmill

Descendants of Thomas Gamey

1825 births
19th-century Irish people
Ontario Patrons of Industry MPPs
Irish emigrants to Canada
1898 deaths
Protestant Protective Association MPPs
People from County Tyrone